Zhao Xing (Chinese: 趙興, pinyin: Zhào Xīng, Cantonese: Zīu6 Hing1, Vietnamese: Triệu Hưng, ? – 112 BC), was the second son of Zhao Yingqi and the fourth ruler of Nanyue. His rule began in 115 BC and ended with his death in 112 BC.

Life
In 113 BC, Emperor Wu of Han sent Anguo Shaoji (安國少季) to summon Zhao Xing and the Queen Dowager Jiu to Chang'an for an audience with the Emperor. The Queen Dowager Jiu, who was Han Chinese, was regarded as a foreigner by the Nanyue people, and it was widely rumored that she had an illicit relationship with Anguo Shaoji before she married Zhao Yingqi. When Anguo arrived, quite a number of people believed the two resumed their relationship. The Queen Dowager feared that there would be a revolt against her authority so she urged the king and his ministers to seek closer times to the Han. Xing agreed to and proposed that relations between Nanyue and the Han should be normalized with a triennial journey to the Han court as well as the removal of custom barriers along the border.

The prime minister Lü Jia (呂嘉) held military power and his family was more well connected than either the king or the Queen Dowager. According to the Shiji and Đại Việt sử ký toàn thư, Lü Jia was chief of a Lạc Việt tribe, related to King Qin of Cangwu by marriage, and over 70 of his kinsmen served as officials in various parts of the Nanyue court. Lü refused to meet the Han envoys which angered the Queen Dowager. She tried to kill him at a banquet but was stopped by Xing. The Queen Dowager tried to gather enough support at court to kill Lü in the following months. 

When news of the situation reached Emperor Wu of Han in 112 BC, he ordered Zhuang Can to lead a 2,000 men expedition to Nanyue. However Zhuang refused to accept the mission, declaring that it was illogical to send so many men under the pretext of peace, but so few to enforce the might of the Han. The former prime minister of Jibei, Han Qianqiu (韓千秋), offered to lead the expedition and arrest Lü Jia. When Han crossed the Han-Nanyue border, Lü conducted a coup, killing Xing, Queen Dowager Jiu and all the Han emissaries in the capital. Xing's brother, Zhao Jiande, was declared the new king.

The Temple name of Zhao Xing was not mentioned in both Shiji and Hanshu. But according to the Vietnamese historical text Đại Việt sử ký toàn thư, Zhao Xing's Posthumous name was Ai Vương (哀王, pinyin: Āi Wáng).

Citations

See also
 Triệu dynasty
 Nanyue
 Zhao Yingqi
 Zhao Jiande
 Panyu District
 Lü Jia (Nanyue)

Bibliography

References
Shiji, vol. 113.
 Book of Han, vol. 95.
Đại Việt sử ký toàn thư, vol.2 (Kỳ Triệu)

112 BC deaths
Vietnamese kings
People from Guangzhou
Year of birth unknown
Nanyue
2nd-century BC Chinese monarchs